The Miss North Dakota Teen USA competition is the pageant that selects the representative for the state of North Dakota in the Miss Teen USA pageant.

Compared to the sister Miss North Dakota USA pageant, North Dakota Teen USAs have been quite successful at Miss Teen USA, and are ranked fifteenth in terms of number and value of placements . North Dakota is one of only ten states to have had nine or more semifinalist (or better) placements at Miss Teen USA . Despite this, no Miss North Dakota Teen USA has ever won the Miss Teen USA crown, though both Audra Mari and Caitlyn Vogel finished as 1st runner-up in 2011 and 2019 respectively.

Seven Miss North Dakota Teen USAs have gone on to win Miss North Dakota USA, and more unusually, two have competed at Miss America, including Stacey Thomas who is the most recent Miss North Dakota Teen USA delegate to compete at the Miss America pageant.

Berkley Lundeen of Minot was crowned Miss North Dakota Teen USA 2022 on May 1, 2022, at the Empire Arts Center in Grand Forks, North Dakota. She represented North Dakota for the title of Miss Teen USA 2022.

Results summary

Placements
1st runners-up: Audra Mari (2011), Caitlyn Vogel (2019)
2nd runner-up: Katie Cooper (2006)
4th runners-up: Dayna Decker (1987), Heidi Langseth (1989)
Top 6: Nicci Elkins (1991)
Top 10: Kari Larson (1984), Jill Hutchinson (1985), Katrina Bergstrom (1996), Julie Nagle (1997), Marisa Field (2003)
Top 15: Breanna Abernathy (2004)
North Dakota holds a record of 12 placements at Miss Teen USA.

Awards
Miss Congeniality: Heidi Langseth (1989), Breanna Abernathy (2004)

Winners 

1 Age at the time of the Miss Teen USA pageant

References

External links
Official website
State Director's Official Website.

North Dakota
Women in North Dakota